Canthiumera is a genus of flowering plants belonging to the family Rubiaceae.

Its native range is Indian subcontinent to Western and Southern Malesia.

Species:

Canthiumera glabra 
Canthiumera neilgherrensis 
Canthiumera robusta 
Canthiumera siamensis

References

Rubiaceae
Rubiaceae genera